Atrazine is a chlorinated herbicide of the triazine class. It is used to prevent pre-emergence broadleaf weeds in crops such as maize (corn), soybean and sugarcane and on turf, such as golf courses and residential lawns. Atrazine's primary manufacturer is Syngenta and it is one of the most widely used herbicides in the United States, Canadian, and Australian agriculture. Its use was banned in the European Union in 2004, when the EU found groundwater levels exceeding the limits set by regulators, and Syngenta could not show that this could be prevented nor that these levels were safe.

At least two significant Canadian farm well studies showed that atrazine was the most common contaminant found. , atrazine was the most commonly detected pesticide contaminating drinking water in the U.S. Studies suggest it is an endocrine disruptor, an agent that can alter the natural hormonal system. However, in 2006 the U.S. Environmental Protection Agency (EPA) had stated that under the Food Quality Protection Act "the risks associated with the pesticide residues pose a reasonable certainty of no harm", and in 2007, the EPA said that atrazine does not adversely affect amphibian sexual development and that no additional testing was warranted. EPA's 2009 review concluded that "the agency's scientific bases for its regulation of atrazine are robust and ensure prevention of exposure levels that could lead to reproductive effects in humans". However, in their 2016 Refined Ecological Risk Assessment for Atrazine, it was stated that "it is difficult to make definitive conclusions about the impact of atrazine at a given concentration but multiple studies have reported effects to various endpoints at environmentally-relevant concentrations." EPA started a registration review in 2013.

The EPA's review has been criticized, and the safety of atrazine remains controversial. EPA has however stated that "If at any time EPA determines there are urgent human or environmental risks from atrazine exposure that require prompt attention, we will take appropriate regulatory action, regardless of the status of the registration review process."

Uses
Atrazine is a herbicide that is used to stop pre- and post-emergence broadleaf and grassy weeds in crops such as sorghum, maize, sugarcane, lupins, pine, and eucalypt plantations, and triazine-tolerant canola.

Atrazine continues to be one of the most widely used herbicides in Australian agriculture. Its effect on corn yields has been estimated from 1% to 8%, with 3–4% being the conclusion of one economics review. In another study looking at combined data from 236 university corn field trials from 1986 to 2005, atrazine treatments showed an average of 5.7 bushels more per acre (~400 kg per hectare) than alternative herbicide treatments. Effects on sorghum yields have been estimated to be as high as 20%, owing in part to the absence of alternative weed control products that can be used on sorghum.

Chemistry and biochemistry
Atrazine was invented in 1958 in the Geigy laboratories as the second of a series of 1,3,5-triazines.

Atrazine is prepared from cyanuric chloride, which is treated sequentially with ethylamine and isopropylamine. Like other triazine herbicides, atrazine functions by binding to the plastoquinone-binding protein in photosystem II, which animals lack. Plant death results from starvation and oxidative damage caused by breakdown in the electron transport process. Oxidative damage is accelerated at high light intensity.

Atrazine's effects in humans and animals primarily involve the endocrine system. Studies suggest that atrazine is an endocrine disruptor that can cause hormone imbalance.

Atrazine has been found to act as an agonist of the G protein-coupled estrogen receptor 1. Atrazine has been shown to bind covalently to (chemically react with) a large number of mammalian proteins.

Environment

Levels
Atrazine contamination of surface water (lakes, rivers, and streams) in the U.S. has been monitored by the EPA and has consistently exceeded levels of concern in two Missouri watersheds and one in Nebraska. Monitoring of atrazine levels in community water systems in 31 high-use states found that levels exceeded levels of concern for infant exposure during at least one year between 1993 and 2001 in 34 of 3670 community water systems using surface water, and in none of 14,500 community water systems using groundwater. Surface water monitoring data from 20 high atrazine use watersheds found peak atrazine levels up to 147 parts per billion, with daily averages in all cases below 10 parts per billion.

Biodegradation

Atrazine remains in soil for a matter of months (although in some soils can persist to at least four years) and can migrate from soil to groundwater; once in groundwater, it degrades slowly. It has been detected in groundwater at high levels in some regions of the U.S. where it is used on some crops and turf. The U.S. Environmental Protection Agency expresses concern regarding contamination of surface waters (lakes, rivers, and streams).

Atrazine degrades in soil primarily by the action of microbes. The half-life of atrazine in soil ranges from 13 to 261 days. Atrazine biodegradation can occur by two known pathways:

Hydrolysis of the C-Cl bond is followed by the ethyl and isopropyl groups, catalyzed by the hydrolase enzymes called AtzA, AtzB, and AtzC. The end product of this process is cyanuric acid, itself unstable with respect to ammonia and carbon dioxide. The best characterized organisms that use this pathway are of Pseudomonas sp. strain ADP.
Dealkylation of the amino groups gives 2-chloro-4-hydroxy-6-amino-1,3,5-triazine, the degradation of which is unknown. This path also occurs in Pseudomonas species, as well as a number of bacteria.

Rates of biodegradation are affected by atrazine's low solubility; thus surfactants may increase the degradation rate. Though the two alkyl moieties readily support growth of certain microorganisms, the atrazine ring is a poor energy source due to the oxidized state of ring carbon. In fact, the most common pathway for atrazine degradation involves the intermediate, cyanuric acid, in which carbon is fully oxidized, thus the ring is primarily a nitrogen source for aerobic microorganisms. Atrazine may be catabolized as a carbon and nitrogen source in reducing environments, and some aerobic atrazine degraders have been shown to use the compound for growth under anoxia in the presence of nitrate as an electron acceptor, a process referred to as a denitrification. When atrazine is used as a nitrogen source for bacterial growth, degradation may be regulated by the presence of alternative sources of nitrogen. In pure cultures of atrazine-degrading bacteria, as well as active soil communities, atrazine ring nitrogen, but not carbon are assimilated into microbial biomass. Low concentrations of glucose can decrease the bioavailability, whereas higher concentrations promote the catabolism of atrazine.

The genes for enzymes AtzA-C have been found to be highly conserved in atrazine-degrading organisms worldwide. In Pseudomonas sp. ADP, the Atz genes are located noncontiguously on a plasmid with the genes for mercury catabolism. AtzA-C genes have also been found in a Gram-positive bacterium, but are chromosomally located. The insertion elements flanking each gene suggest that they are involved in the assembly of this specialized catabolic pathway. Two options exist for degradation of atrazine using microbes, bioaugmentation or biostimulation. Recent research suggests that microbial adaptation to atrazine has occurred in some fields where the herbicide is used repetitively, resulting in more rapid biodegradation. Like the herbicides trifluralin and alachlor, atrazine is susceptible to rapid transformation in the presence of reduced iron-bearing soil clays, such as ferruginous smectites. In natural environments, some iron-bearing minerals are reduced by specific bacteria in the absence of oxygen, thus the abiotic transformation of herbicides by reduced minerals is viewed as "microbially induced".

Photolysis

In 2016, photolytic degradation with 254 nm ultraviolet was seen by the authors of a particular study as an efficient process, which could be used in pilot plants to reduce or eliminate compounds of the atrazine class or similar emerging contaminants, in effluents.

Health effects
The dermal LD50 in rabbits is 7500 mg/kg and greater than 3000 mg/kg in rats. The 1-hour inhalation LC50 is greater than 0.7 mg/L in rats. The 4-hour inhalation LC50 is 5.2 mg/L in rats." The maximum contaminant level is 0.003 mg/L and the reference dose is 0.035 mg/kg/day.

Mammals

A September 2003 review by the Agency for Toxic Substances and Disease Registry (ATSDR) stated that atrazine is "currently under review for pesticide re-registration by the EPA because of concerns that atrazine may cause cancer", but not enough information was available to "definitely state whether it causes cancer in humans."  According to the ATSDR, one of the primary ways that atrazine can affect a person's health is "by altering the way that the reproductive system works. Studies of couples living on farms that use atrazine for weed control found an increase in the risk of preterm delivery, but these studies are difficult to interpret because most of the farmers were men who may have been exposed to several types of pesticides.  Little information is available regarding the risks to children, however "[m]aternal exposure to atrazine in drinking water has been associated with low fetal weight and heart, urinary, and limb defects in humans". Incidence of a birth defect known as gastroschisis appears to be higher in areas where surface water atrazine levels are elevated especially when conception occurs in the spring, the time when atrazine is commonly applied.

The World Health Organization's International Agency for Research on Cancer has classified atrazine as "not classifiable as to its carcinogenicity to humans" (Group 3).

The EPA determined in 2003 "that atrazine is not likely to cause cancer in humans".

In 2006, the EPA stated, "the risks associated with the pesticide residues pose a reasonable certainty of no harm".

In 2007, the EPA said, "studies thus far suggest that atrazine is an endocrine disruptor". The implications for children's health are related to effects during pregnancy and during sexual development, though few studies are available. In people, risks for preterm delivery and intrauterine growth retardation have been associated with exposure. Atrazine exposure has been shown to result in delays or changes in pubertal development in female rats; conflicting results have been observed in males.  Male rats exposed via milk from orally exposed mothers exhibited higher levels of prostate inflammation as adults; immune effects have also been seen in male rats exposed in utero or while nursing. EPA opened a new review in 2009 that concluded that "the agency's scientific bases for its regulation of atrazine are robust and ensure prevention of exposure levels that could lead to reproductive effects in humans."  Deborah A. Cory-Slechta, a professor at the University of Rochester in New York has said in 2014, "The way the E.P.A. tests chemicals can vastly underestimate risks." She has studied atrazine's effects on the brain and serves on the E.P.A.'s science advisory board.  She further stated, "There's still a huge amount we don't know about atrazine."

A Natural Resources Defense Council report from 2009 said that the EPA is ignoring atrazine contamination in surface and drinking water in the central United States.

Research results from the U.S. National Cancer Institute's 2011 Agricultural Health Study concluded, "there was no consistent evidence of an association between atrazine use and any cancer site". The study tracked 57,310 licensed pesticide applicators over 13 years.

A 2011 review of the mammalian reproductive toxicology of atrazine jointly conducted by the World Health Organization and the Food and Agriculture Organization of the United Nations concluded that atrazine was not teratogenic.  Reproductive effects in rats and rabbits were only seen at doses that were toxic to the mother. Observed adverse effects in rats included fetal resorption in rates (at doses > 50 mg/kg per day), delays in sexual development in female rats (at doses >30 mg/kg per day), and decreased birth weight (at doses >3.6 mg/kg per day).

A 2014 systematic review, funded by atrazine manufacturer Syngenta, assessed its relation to reproductive health problems. The authors concluded that the quality of most studies was poor and without good quality data, the results were difficult to assess, though it was noted that no single category of negative pregnancy outcome was found consistently across studies.  The authors concluded that a causal link between atrazine and adverse pregnancy outcomes was not warranted due to the poor quality of the data and the lack of robust findings across studies.  Syngenta was not involved in the design, collection, management, analysis, or interpretation of the data and did not participate in the preparation of the manuscript.

Amphibians
Atrazine has been a suspected teratogen, with some studies reporting causing demasculinization in male northern leopard frogs even at low concentrations, and an endocrine disruptor. A 2002 study by Tyrone Hayes, of the University of California, Berkeley, found that exposure caused male tadpoles to turn into hermaphrodites – frogs with both male and female sexual characteristics. However, this study has not been able to be replicated, and a 2003 EPA review of this study concluded that overcrowding, questionable sample handling techniques, and the failure of the authors to disclose key details including sample sizes, dose-response effects, and the variability of observed effects made it difficult to assess the study's credibility and ecological relevance. A 2005 study, requested by EPA and conducted under EPA guidance and inspection, was unable to reproduce Hayes' results.

The EPA's Scientific Advisory Panel examined relevant studies and concluded in 2010, "atrazine does not adversely affect amphibian gonadal development based on a review of laboratory and field studies". It recommended proper study design for further investigation. As required by the EPA, two experiments were conducted under Good Laboratory Practices (GLP) and were inspected by EPA and German regulatory authorities, concluding 2009 that "long-term exposure of larval X. laevis to atrazine at concentrations ranging from 0.01 to 100 μg/L does not affect growth, larval development, or sexual differentiation". A 2008 report cited the independent work of researchers in Japan, who were unable to replicate Hayes' work. "The scientists found no hermaphrodite frogs; no increase in aromatase as measured by aromatase mRNA induction; and no increase in vitellogenin, another marker of feminization."

A 2007 study examined the relative importance of environmentally relevant concentrations of atrazine on trematode cercariae versus tadpole defense against infection. Its principal finding was that susceptibility of wood frog tadpoles to infection by E. trivolvis is increased only when hosts were exposed to an atrazine concentration of 30 mg/L and not to 3 mg/L.

A 2008 study reported that tadpoles developed deformed hearts and impaired kidneys and digestive systems when chronically exposed to atrazine concentrations of 10 ppm in their early stages of life. Tissue malformation may have been induced by ectopic programmed cell death, although a mechanism was not identified.

In 2010, the Australian Pesticides and Veterinary Medicines Authority (APVMA) tentatively concluded that environmental atrazine "at existing levels of exposure" was not affecting amphibian populations in Australia consistent with the 2007 EPA findings. APVMA responded to Hayes' 2010 published paper, that his findings "do not provide sufficient evidence to justify a reconsideration of current regulations which are based on a very extensive dataset."

A 2015 EPA article discussed the Hayes/Syngenta conflict to illustrate both financial and nonfinancial conflicts of interest. The authors concluded, "Statements by Hayes and Syngenta suggest that their scientific differences have developed a personal aspect that casts doubt on their scientific objectivity".

2012 Class action lawsuit

In 2012, Syngenta, manufacturer of atrazine, was the defendant in a class-action lawsuit concerning the levels of atrazine in human water supplies. Syngenta agreed to pay $105 million to reimburse more than one thousand water systems for "the cost of filtering atrazine from drinking water". The company denied all wrongdoing.

2015 Canadian regulatory review
Prompted by the EU's 2004 ban, a regulatory review of the product in Canada by the PMRA was begun in 2015. On 31 March 2017 the review result was published and the PMRA decided to leave unchanged the product's registration. This was done because while the EU's ban was based on a legislated pollutant level of 0.1 μg/L, the Canadian regulations call for a home-grown "risk-based scientific approach in determining the risk to human health from pesticides in drinking water." The US drinking water standard of 3 μg/L is approximately the same to the Canadian standard of 5 μg/L. Both maximum pollutant levels in North America were not exceeded by the maximum pollutant level in Canadian data of 2.32 μg/L.

See also
 Pesticides in the United States – Atrazine
 Endocrine disruptor
 Simazine

References

External links
Atrazine- PubChem(National library of medicine) - atrazine
Atrazine Fact Sheet - National Pesticide Information Center - Atrazine Fact Sheet
Atrazine - CDC - NIOSH Pocket Guide to Chemical Hazards

Endocrine disruptors
GPER agonists
Herbicides
Triazines
Chloroarenes
Suspected teratogens
Xenoestrogens
Isopropylamino compounds